George Maddox may refer to:

 George Maddox (cricketer) (1811–1867), Australian cricketer
 George Maddox (American football) (1911–1956), player in the National Football League
 George Maddox (architect) (1760–1843), British architect and artist
 George Vaughan Maddox (1802–1864), British architect and builder